Taking 300 or more wickets across a playing career is considered a significant achievement in Test cricket. The feat, first accomplished by Englishman Fred Trueman in 1964, has only been achieved by 36 cricketers in the history of the game . Seven players from Australia and six players from India, five each from England and South Africa, four from New Zealand and the West Indies and three each from Pakistan and Sri Lanka have crossed the 300-wicket mark in Tests. Afghanistan, Bangladesh, Ireland and Zimbabwe are yet to see a player reach the 300 mark.

As of June 2022, former Sri Lankan cricketer Muttiah Muralitharan has the highest aggregate with 800 wickets. He also holds the record for the most five-wicket hauls (67) and ten-wicket hauls in a match (22); his 16 wickets for 220 runs against England in 1998 is the fifth-best bowling performance by a player in a match. Indian spinner Ravichandran Ashwin is the fastest to cross the 300-wicket mark (54 Tests), while the late West Indian player Malcolm Marshall has the best bowling average (20.94) among those who have achieved the milestone. Fellow West Indian Lance Gibbs is the most economical player with 1.98 runs per over, while South African fast bowler Dale Steyn has the best strike rate of 42.3 balls per wicket. India's Anil Kumble has the second-best bowling figures in an innings (ten wickets for 74 runs against Pakistan in 1999); they are the second-best in the history of Test cricket after English off-spin bowler Jim Laker's ten for 53 (against Australia in 1956).

Key

 Mat. – Number of matches played
 Inn. – Number of innings bowled
 Balls – Balls bowled in career
 Runs – Runs conceded in career
 Wkts – Wickets taken in career
 Ave. – Average runs per wicket
 Econ. – Runs conceded per over
 SR. – Number of balls bowled per wicket taken
 BBI – Best bowling in an innings
 BBM – Best bowling in a match
 5w/i – Five or more wickets in an innings
 10w/m – Ten or more wickets in a match
 Period – Cricketing career of the player

Bowlers with 300 or more Test wickets

Statistics are correct .
The list is initially sorted by the most wickets taken by a bowler. To sort this table by any statistic, click on the arrows next to the column title.

By team

See also
 List of Test cricket records
 List of bowlers who have taken 300 or more wickets in One Day International cricket
 List of bowlers who have taken 100 or more wickets in Twenty20 International

References

Test cricket records